Nicky van Hilten (born 22 February 1997) is a Dutch professional football player. He plays as a right back for DVS '33.

Club career
Van Hilten made his Eerste Divisie debut for Almere City on 2 April 2018 in a game against RKC Waalwijk, as a starter.

References

External links
 

1997 births
Living people
Dutch footballers
Association football defenders
Almere City FC players
DVS '33 players
Eerste Divisie players
Tweede Divisie players
Derde Divisie players
Footballers from Amsterdam